De Montmorency College of Dentistry (DCD) is located in Lahore, Punjab, Pakistan. It is situated next to the Badshahi Masjid. The college is named after former Punjab Governor Sir Geoffrey Fitzhervey de Montmorency who remained in office till start of 1930s. It has been the highest merit college upon enrolment of new students consistently for years. 

Each year it enrols a hundred students in its 4 year BDS programme. It is affiliated with the University of Health and Sciences and it’s associated hospital is the Punjab Dental Hospital. It has two active societies, the Sports committee and the DDLS (de'Montmorency debating and literacy society). The Sports Committee acts as the Student Council body of the college. Prof.Dr. Waheed-ul-Hamid is the current principal of the college.

Every year the college holds a number of events, the Annual Dinner being the most significant. The Annual Dinner held in 2019.08.28 reunited the famous Pakistani musical band, The Aarish, on the event.

Notable alumni 
 Arif Alvi, the President of Pakistan

References

Universities and colleges in Lahore District
Dental schools in Pakistan